The Gambler is a 1938 German drama film directed by Gerhard Lamprecht and starring Eugen Klöpfer, Lída Baarová, and Hedwig Bleibtreu. It is based on Fyodor Dostoevsky's 1866 novel The Gambler. Due to the scandal over Baarová's affair with Joseph Goebbels, followed by her return to Czechoslovakia, the film was withdrawn from cinemas three days after its release. It was not given a release again until 1950. A similar fate had befallen another film of hers A Prussian Love Story.

The film's sets were designed by the art directors Robert Herlth and Heinrich Weidemann.

A separate French-language version Le Joueur (1938) was also released, with Pierre Blanchar and Viviane Romance.

Plot 
Young Russian Nina is staying with her father, retired General Kirileff, in the German spa town of Hohenburg. Her father has gambled away his fortune at the roulette table and is now borrowing more money from the supposed Baron Vincent at exorbitant interest. He wants to get Kirileff to agree to his marriage to Nina, who will be entitled to a large inheritance when her grandmother dies. Nina can't stand Baron Vincent, since she saw through his machinations. Blanche du Placet, rumored to be a countess, is in tow of Vincent. Her intentions are similar to those of the baron: she ensnares Kirileff, who has already proposed to her. Blanche thinks he's a big landowner in Russia. Alexej, a former student and now secretary of Kirileff, and the German doctor Dr. Tronka up. Alexej is in love with Nina, but she takes advantage of his feelings depending on her mood. Dr Tronka, who is also not indifferent to the young woman, is treated with a hardly perceptible condescension.

When Vincent presses for the bills to be paid, Kirileff, in his distress, claims that he knows for sure that Nina's grandmother is dying. Nina is dismayed by her father's behavior and wants to save the family honor. She sells her jewelry and tries to win the missing money at the gaming table. In the end, she gambles everything away and her father's ruin seems sealed. A telegram from home seems to be the solution to all problems, since Kirileff believes that Nina's grandmother has died. This, however, appears a short time later in Hohenburg and discovers the roulette game for itself. She loses a large amount of money while gambling, but knows when to stop and soon travels back to Russia. Nina decides against going with them and stays with her father. The young woman also rejects other offers of help, so she doesn't want Dr. Tronka pays off her father's debts. She fears selling herself to him. Alexej, on the other hand, can no longer help her because he has become a player himself. Due to all the excitement, Nina falls ill and confides in Dr. Tronka on. Shortly thereafter, he challenges Vincent to a duel, and the false baron flees. He gives Kirileff's bills to Blanche, who begins a relationship with Alexej and sells him the bills. dr Tronka nurses Nina back to health. Suddenly, Alexei appears and assures the young woman that he has always loved her and cannot live without her. He wants to return to Russia with Nina, and tells her that he has already destroyed her father's bills of exchange. However, these were only recently discovered by Dr. Bought out Tronka. When Alexej finds out about this, he realizes that Blanche must have stolen the bills and sold them again. His proof of love to Nina, to save her father by buying the bills of exchange, is therefore void. This realization enrages Alexei so much that he wants to do something to Blanche. Nina asks Dr. Tronka to stop Alexej and actually the doctor can prevent worse. He makes Alexei promise not to play anymore and gives him travel money for his return to Russia. while dr Tronka visits Nina and explains to her that she is relieved of any obligation towards Alexej and should now let her feelings decide about her future, Alexej cannot resist his addiction: In the casino he spends all the travel money that Dr. Tronka has received at the roulette table at stake.

Cast

References

Bibliography

External links 
 

1938 films
1930s historical drama films
German historical drama films
Films of Nazi Germany
1930s German-language films
Films directed by Gerhard Lamprecht
Films about gambling
Films set in the 1860s
Films based on The Gambler
German multilingual films
Tobis Film films
German black-and-white films
1938 multilingual films
1938 drama films
1930s German films